Neurada is a genus of flowering plants in the family Neuradaceae, found in northern Africa,  Cyprus, the Arabian Peninsula, the Levant, Iraq, Iran, Afghanistan, Pakistan and India. They are desert-adapted prostrate annual herbs with bizarre spiny flowers and fruits. Local people use them as a medicinal herb for a variety of conditions and as a nerve tonic. It is also used for camel fodder.

Species
Currently accepted species include:

Neurada al-eisawii  Barsotti, Borzatti & Garbari
Neurada procumbens L.

References

Neuradaceae
Malvales genera